Helga Brofeldt (born Helga Amelie Elisabet Textorius; 9 October 1881 – 18 June 1968) was a Swedish stage and film actress. She appeared alongside John Elfström as his wife in several of the Åsa-Nisse series of comedy films.

Selected filmography
 A Perfect Gentleman (1927)
 The Realm of the Rye (1929)
 Say It with Music (1929)
 His Life's Match (1932)
 Black Roses (1932)
 International Match (1932)
 The Southsiders (1932)
 Marriageable Daughters (1933)
 What Do Men Know? (1933)
 Andersson's Kalle (1934)
 Our Boy (1936)
 Hotel Paradise (1937)
 The People of Bergslagen (1937)
 Good Friends and Faithful Neighbours (1938)
 Bashful Anton (1940)
 Lasse-Maja (1941)
 The Talk of the Town (1941)
 The Case of Ingegerd Bremssen (1942)
 We House Slaves (1942)
 The Brothers' Woman (1943)
 Blizzard (1944)
Widower Jarl (1945)
 The Night Watchman's Wife (1947)
 Sven Tusan (1949)
 Bohus Battalion (1949)
 Åsa-Nisse (1949)
 Big Lasse of Delsbo (1949)
 Father Bom (1949)
Åsa-Nisse Goes Hunting (1950)
 Perhaps a Gentleman (1950)
 A Ghost on Holiday (1951)
 Kalle Karlsson of Jularbo (1952)
 The Girl from Backafall (1953)
 Åsa-Nisse on Holiday (1953)
 The Glass Mountain (1953)
 Ursula, the Girl from the Finnish Forests (1953)
 Café Lunchrasten (1954)
 Young Summer (1954)
 People of the Finnish Forests (1955)
Seventh Heaven (1956)
 Stage Entrance (1956)

References

Bibliography 
 Rochelle Wright. The Visible Wall: Jews and Other Ethnic Outsiders in Swedish Film. SIU Press, 1998.

External links 
 

1881 births
1968 deaths
Swedish film actresses
Swedish silent film actresses
Swedish stage actresses
Actresses from Stockholm
20th-century Swedish actresses